The Cop Universe is an Indian media franchise and shared universe created by Rohit Shetty consisting of media focusing on police officers. The franchise includes films, animated series, video games and web series. The shared universe was established by crossing over common plot elements, settings, cast, and characters.

The first two films, Singham (2011) and Singham Returns (2014) focus on Bajirao Singham, an honest DCP who fights for justice. The third, Simmba (2018), focuses on Sangram "Simmba" Bhalerao, a corrupt Inspector from the same town as Bajirao, who takes advantage of his job. The franchise has another installment, Sooryavanshi (2021) starring Akshay Kumar as Veer Sooryavanshi, another DCP.

Development 

Seeing the success of the Tamil-language film, Singam (2010), directed by Hari, the film rights for the Hindi and Kannada versions were sold by the makers. Reliance Big Pictures, which co-produced the original version, bought the Hindi remake rights and announced in November 2010 that the version would feature Rohit Shetty as director and Ajay Devgn in the lead. Prakash Raj was signed on to reprise his role as the antagonist from the original. In February 2011, Kajal Aggarwal was signed in as the female lead. The movie was named "Singham". The film received mixed critical response but the film was declared a 'super hit' at the box office, collecting .

After the commercial success of Singham, Shetty announced that plans were being made to direct a sequel to Singham. The movie was named Singham Returns. Devgn was reprising his role from Singham. However, Kareena Kapoor was cast as the female lead this time. The film received mixed reviews and just like its predecessor, Singham Returns was declared a 'super hit' at the box office collecting .

Following Singham Returns' success, Shetty showed interest in remaking the Telugu film Temper (2015). He stated in an interview, "We have bought the rights of Temper but our film is not exactly a remake. We wanted to take four-five scenes from Temper but we thought it's better to buy the rights." The film was named "Simmba" and Ranveer Singh was cast as Simmba, along with Sara Ali Khan for the female lead. The film received positive reviews and was declared as a 'blockbuster, collecting .

In the post-credits scene, the filmmakers revealed the next movie in the cop universe, Sooryavanshi, which cast Akshay Kumar in the lead role. The shooting was wrapped in late 2019, and was heading towards a March 2020 release, however the film was postponed due to COVID-19 pandemic, before it finally released after a year, on 5 November 2021.

Films

Singham (2011) 

It is the Hindi remake of the Tamil film Singam. It stars Ajay Devgn as Inspector Bajirao Singham, Kajal Aggarwal as Kavya Bhosle, and Prakash Raj as Jaykant Shikre. It was released on 22 July 2011.

Singham Returns (2014) 

The plot was inspired by the Malayalam film Ekalavyan. It stars Devgn as DCP Bajirao Singham, Kareena Kapoor as Avni Kamat, and Amole Gupte as Babaji. It was released on 15 August 2014.

Simmba (2018) 

The film is a remake of the Telugu film Temper. It stars Ranveer Singh as Senior Police Inspector Sangram Bhalerao (Simmba), Sara Ali Khan as Shagun Sathe, and Sonu Sood as Durva Ranade. Ajay Devgn and Akshay Kumar appear in cameo appearances, with the former reprising his role of DCP Bajirao Singham, while the latter played another DCP named Veer Sooryavanshi. It was released on 28 December 2018.

Sooryavanshi (2021) 

The film sees Kumar reprising his role of DCP Veer Sooryavanshi, but in the lead role, with Katrina Kaif as Ria Sooryavanshi. It was scheduled to release on 30 April 2021 but postponed due to COVID-19. It was released on 5 November 2021 coinciding with Diwali.

Singham Again (2024) 
Rohit Shetty has confirmed that there will be a third installment of Singham franchise after the release of Sooryavanshi. Ajay Devgn will reprise his role as Singham.

Web series

Indian Police Force
The upcoming series will star Sidharth Malhotra as Kabir Malik, Vivek Oberoi as Rathore and Shilpa Shetty as an officer in Delhi Police. The series is currently under production and is set to premiere on Amazon Prime Video soon. Rohit Shetty is the showrunner and producer. Shetty is also working closely on the script and action scenes of the project. It will be an eight episode series.

Cast and Characters

Additional crew and production details

Release and revenue

In other media

Animated series 

An animated series named Little Singham based on Singham was released in 2018. Another animated series named Smashing Simmba based on Simmba was released in 2020.A third animated series Baby Little Singham, which was sequel of 2018 animated series Little Singham.

Games 
A mobile game called Singam Returns: The Game based on Singham Returns was released in 2014 by Zapak Mobile Games for Android. Another Android mobile game was released in 2018 based on the television series, Little Singham in 2018 by Zapak Mobile Games.

See also
 YRF Spy Universe
Dhoom (franchise)
Tiger (franchise)
Race (film series)
Baaghi (film series)
Dinesh Vijan's horror-comedy universe
 K.G.F (film series)
 Lokesh Cinematic Universe
 HIT Universe

References

External links 

 
Indian film series
Action film franchises
Fictional portrayals of police departments in India
Films adapted into television shows
Films adapted for other media
Shared universes
Fictional universes